Glenys Quick (born 29 November 1957) is a retired female long-distance runner from New Zealand, who won the 1984 edition of Nagoya Marathon, clocking a total time of 2:34:25.

Achievements

References
ARRS

1957 births
Living people
New Zealand female long-distance runners
Place of birth missing (living people)
Athletes (track and field) at the 1982 Commonwealth Games
Commonwealth Games competitors for New Zealand
New Zealand female marathon runners